Tenzing Peak is the name which has been proposed by the Government of Nepal for a  peak in the Himalayas in honour of Tenzing Norgay, who made the first ascent of Everest with Edmund Hillary in 1953. It is also known variously as Ngojumba Kang, Ngozumpa Kang and Ngojumba Ri.

In September 2013 a government panel recommended that two mountains on the ridge between Cho Oyu and Gyachung Kang be called Hillary Peak and Tenzing Peak as part of a batch of new summits that would be opened to climbers in 2014. It is in fact a satellite peak of Cho Oyu.

It was first climbed on 24 April 1965 by Naomi Uemura and Pemba Tenzing as part of a Japanese expedition from the Alpine Club of Meiji University.

References

Mountains of the Himalayas
Mountains of Koshi Province
Tenzing Norgay
Seven-thousanders of the Himalayas